Lino Baldassarre Giovanni Battista Mosca Cirvella (August 27, 1907 in Campiglia Cervo – February 15, 1992) was an Italian professional football player.

Honours
 Serie A champion: 1930/31.

1907 births
1992 deaths
Italian footballers
Serie A players
Juventus F.C. players
U.S. Cremonese players
Association football midfielders
A.S.D. La Biellese players
Campiglia Cervo